Khoo Poay Tiong (born 13 December 1970) is a Malaysian politician who has served as the Member of Parliament (MP) for Kota Melaka since May 2018. He served as State Leader of the Opposition of Melaka from July 2013 to May 2018 and Member of the Melaka State Legislative Assembly (MLA) for Ayer Keroh from March 2008 to May 2018. He is a member of the Democratic Action Party (DAP), a component party of Pakatan Harapan (PH) opposition coalition.  He has served as the Assistant National Organising Secretary of DAP since November 2017.  

In the 14th General Election 2018 general election, Khoo was elected to the Parliament of Malaysia for the Kota Melaka constituency, winning 76,518 of the 105,276 votes cast.

Previously, Khoo was a former state assemblyman for Ayer Keroh state seat for two terms (2008 to 2013 and 2013 to 2018) and also a former State Opposition Leader for Malacca State Legislative Assembly for one term.

Personal life 
Khoo is the eldest son of Khoo Nian Koon, a tailor in Malacca town. He is married to Lee Wei Cheng (李慧贞) with three daughters.

Education 
Khoo Poay Tiong graduated with Bachelor of Arts (Honours) Economics from University of Malaya.

Political career 
Prior to his political life, Khoo was a senior manager at Maybank before quitting his job to pursue full time in a life as a politician in year 2008. He was first elected as a State Assemblyman for Ayer Keroh, by successfully crushing a long held stronghold of Barisan Nasional of Ayer Keroh state seat by beating Chiew Hong Lan in the 12th General Election. 

In year 2013, during the 13th General Election, Khoo retained his state assembly seat and was elected as the State Opposition Leader for the state of Malacca. 

During the 14th General Election in year 2018, he contested for the Parliamentary seat of Kota Melaka and was elected as a Member of Parliament.

Election results

References

Living people
1970 births
Malaysian politicians of Chinese descent
Democratic Action Party (Malaysia) politicians
Members of the Dewan Rakyat
Members of the Malacca State Legislative Assembly
21st-century Malaysian politicians